Arthur J. Crowns (January 24, 1922 – October 13, 2008) was a member of the Wisconsin State Assembly.

Biography
Crowns was born on January 24, 1922, in Wisconsin Rapids, Wisconsin. He attended what is now the University of Wisconsin-Stevens Point, Florida State University and the University of Wisconsin-Madison, and University of Wisconsin Law School and began practicing law. During World War II, he served in the United States Army Air Forces. He taught at Florida State University, Memphis State University, and Wichita State University. He died in Wichita, Kansas, on October 13, 2008.

Political career
Crowns was elected to the Assembly in 1956 before being defeated for re-election in 1958. He was a Republican.

References

Politicians from Wichita, Kansas
People from Wisconsin Rapids, Wisconsin
Republican Party members of the Wisconsin State Assembly
Military personnel from Wisconsin
United States Army Air Forces personnel of World War II
United States Army Air Forces soldiers
University of Wisconsin–Stevens Point alumni
University of Wisconsin–Madison alumni
University of Wisconsin Law School alumni
Florida State University alumni
Florida State University faculty
University of Memphis faculty
Wichita State University faculty
Wisconsin lawyers
1922 births
2008 deaths
Kansas Republicans
20th-century American politicians
20th-century American lawyers